Youssoupha may refer to:

Youssoupha (born 1979), French Congolese rapper
Youssoupha "Yous" Mbao (born 1990), Senegalese basketball player

See also
Youssouf / Yousef / Youssef etc